Saving Christmas (also known as Kirk Cameron's Saving Christmas) is a 2014 American faith-based Christmas comedy film. It was directed by Darren Doane and written by Doane and Cheston Hervey, based on an original story by Kirk Cameron. It was theatrically released by Samuel Goldwyn Films on November 14, 2014.

The movie stars Cameron as a fictionalized version of himself. In Saving Christmas, Cameron, after explaining his views on Christmas directly to the audience, tries to convince his fictional brother-in-law, played by the film's director, that Christmas is still a Christian holiday.

The film received a 0% rating on Rotten Tomatoes. It was nominated in six categories for the 35th Golden Raspberry Awards and won four, including Worst Picture. It also became the lowest-rated film on the IMDb Bottom 100 List within one month of its theatrical release, and is now considered one of the worst films of all time. Despite being panned by professional critics, Cameron is convinced that his film's low rating from IMDb users is the result of "haters", "pagans" and an atheist conspiracy that was allegedly hatched on Reddit.

Plot
In a framing sequence, Cameron—as himself—addresses the audience from beside a fireplace, explaining his love of Christmas. Cameron goes on to express his views on the contemporary celebration of Christmas, which include his beliefs that atheists have tried to "take the holiday away" and that Santa Claus is a Christian. Cameron also criticizes fundamentalist Christians who have politicized the holiday by tying the celebration to Pagan traditions and making accusations that the holiday has become too tied to materialism.

The film switches to its main narrative, in which Cameron attends a Christmas party at his sister's house. There, he notices that his brother-in-law, Christian, is not celebrating like the other guests. When asked why Christian tells Cameron that he feels the holiday became too commercialized and consumerist, and that he feels uncomfortable with what he believes are Pagan elements of contemporary Christmas celebration. Cameron tells Christian that he is wrong and recites the story of the Nativity, which is depicted in cartoon form. Meanwhile, two guests at the party discuss conspiracy theories.

Christian complains that several elements of Christmas, most notably Christmas trees, are not biblical in origin. Cameron tells him that Christmas trees were God's idea since God created trees. He also says that each tree represents a Christian cross; breaking the fourth wall, Cameron encourages the audience to visualize a cross every time they see a Christmas tree. Cameron further addresses several other concerns Christian has about the historicity of the holiday, including its date and the role of the Three Wise Men. Cameron ties the Nativity directly to the crucifixion, saying that baby Jesus' swaddling cloth was a foreshadowing of his burial shroud, and claims that the gifts of frankincense and myrrh were used to treat dead bodies in a form of primitive embalming. Cameron encourages Christian and the audience to place nutcracker dolls around Nativity sets to represent Herod's soldiers during the Massacre of the Innocents.

Christian is convinced by the arguments, but then complains that Santa has replaced Jesus as the figurehead of the holiday; he further expresses discomfort over the fact that "Santa" is an anagram of "Satan". Cameron tells Christian the story of Saint Nicholas, including a reenactment of the First Council of Nicaea in which Nicholas had supposedly violently assaulted Arius for heresy. Cameron claims that, after the council, Nicholas went out and began beating other heretics for teaching false doctrine, and that "Nicholas was 'bad', in a good way". Cameron explains that St. Nicholas was the basis for Santa Claus, who was a byproduct of Nicholas' story being diluted by secular culture. With this knowledge, Christian joyously declares that "Santa is the man".

Reassured of Christmas' Christian roots, Cameron and Christian return to the party. Cameron criticizes people who feel that the holiday is too commercial, saying that because God took on material form, it is appropriate to celebrate using material things through the giving of expensive gifts. Cameron explains that presents represent Jerusalem, and that Christmas is "doing what God does", as God has given humanity many gifts. Cameron then issues a plea to the audience to make Christmas an overtly religious holiday again, "for our children". Christian, as a gift to his wife, organizes a hip hop dance to symbolize his love of Christmas, set to "Angels We Have Heard on High". Cameron, Christian, and all the party guests breakdance in an extended musical sequence. Cameron then tells everyone to feast and suggests the audience organize the best dinner possible for Christmas, but not to forget it is a celebration of God.

Cast
 Kirk Cameron as himself
 Darren Doane as Christian White, Kirk's brother-in-law
 Bridgette Ridenour as Kirk's sister
 David Shannon as Diondre
 Raphi Henly as conspiracy theorist
 Ben Kientz as St. Nick

Release
Saving Christmas debuted on 410 screens on November 14, 2014.

Box office
On its first weekend, the film came in fifteenth place with ticket sales of $992,087, with a per-screen average of $2,420. In its six-week run, the film grossed $2.7 million at the box office against a $500,000 budget.

Critical reception
On Rotten Tomatoes, the film received a rating of 0%, based on 19 reviews, with an average rating of 2.4/10. On Metacritic, the film received a rating of 18 out of 100, based on 9 critics, indicating "overwhelming dislike". New York Times film critic Ben Kenigsberg said that Cameron's acting "sounds so forced you half-expect the camera to pull back to reveal hostage takers". Billings Gazette named it the worst Christmas movie of all time in 2016, and Will Nicol of Digital Trends included it on his list of the ten worst movies ever made. Christy Lemire picked Saving Christmas as the worst film she has ever reviewed.

In The Christian Post, an evangelical Christian newspaper, Emma Koonse wrote, "[Kirk Cameron] dismisses theories that Christmas is derived in [sic] the pagan celebration of Winter Solstice in Saving Christmas, offering viewers a Biblical reference to items such as the Christmas tree instead. Furthermore, the film reveals Cameron's take on Santa Claus, the three wise men, and why Christmas is celebrated on Dec. 25 each year...  Although Cameron attempts to defend Christmas traditions in Saving Christmas, many Christians remain divided over what the Bible says about celebrating Christ's birth as well as where the varied Christmas traditions originated and what the customs mean in reference to Jesus."

Cameron's response to critics
On November 20, 2014, Cameron responded to the negative reviews by posting on his Facebook page. He wrote, "Help me storm the gates of Rotten Tomatoes. All of you who love Saving Christmas – go rate it at Rotten Tomatoes right now and send the message to all the critics that WE decide what movies we want our families to see." The attempt resulted in a severe backlash in which Internet users traveled to the Rotten Tomatoes page and condemned the film.

Three weeks after the film's release, the film gained additional notoriety when it became the lowest-rated film on IMDb's bottom 100 list. Cameron later responded to the low rating, saying that it was due to a campaign on Reddit by "haters and atheists" to purposely lower the film's ratings.

Awards and nominations

Home media
Saving Christmas was released on DVD on November 3, 2015. The film was also made available on Hulu in March 2016, although it has since been removed from the site.

Soundtrack

A soundtrack album was released on October 27, 2014 by Reunion Records.
 "Joy" – 1 Girl Nation
 "Christmas Time Again" – Steven Curtis Chapman
 "Saving Christmas" – Building 429
 "Let Us Adore" – Jason Crabb
 "O Holy Night" – Kerrie Roberts
 "Away in a Manger" – Casting Crowns
 "Deck the Halls" – Tenth Avenue North
 "O Little Town of Bethlehem" – Rebecca St. James
 "Hark! The Herald Angels Sing" – Matt Maher
 "O come, O come, Emmanuel" – Rhett Walker Band

See also
 List of Christmas films
 List of films considered the worst

References

External links
 
 
 
 
 

2010s Christmas comedy films
2014 comedy films
2014 films
2014 independent films
American Christmas comedy films
American independent films
Cultural depictions of actors
Films about Christianity
Films shot in Los Angeles
Golden Raspberry Award winning films
Liberty University
Samuel Goldwyn Productions films
2010s English-language films
2010s American films